The Waggoner Mansion (a.k.a. El Castile) is a historic mansion in Decatur, Texas.  The sixteen room mansion was built in 1883 by the Waggoner Family.  It was purchased in 1942 by Mr. and Mrs. Phil Luker.

Location
The mansion is located at 1003 East Main in Decatur, a town in Wise County, Texas. It spans thirteen and a half acres of land.

History
The mansion was built in 1883 for Daniel Waggoner, owner of the Waggoner Ranch. It was designed in the Victorian architectural style. It comprises sixteen rooms and six bathrooms, with two bedrooms on the ground floor and four bedrooms on the first floor.

The house was inherited by Daniel Waggoner's son, William Thomas Waggoner. In 1942, it was purchased by Mrs and Mr Phil Luker.

It is listed on the National Register of Historic Places.

See also

National Register of Historic Places listings in Wise County, Texas
Recorded Texas Historic Landmarks in Wise County

References

External links

Houses on the National Register of Historic Places in Texas
Houses in Wise County, Texas
Houses completed in 1883
Victorian architecture in Texas
National Register of Historic Places in Wise County, Texas